John Joseph Sheehan (29 May 1890 – 17 June 1933) was an Australian rules footballer who played with the Collingwood Football Club and Richmond Football Club in the Victorian Football League (VFL). He was also listed with the Melbourne Football Club, but never played a game.

Military service
He enlisted in the First AIF on 12 July 1915. He did not serve overseas. He was discharged from the AIF on 6 November 1916, on medical grounds, subsequent to surgery for a rectal fistula.

Football

New South Wales
He was the coach of the New South Wales team at the sixth Australian National Football Carnival, held in Melbourne in August 1927.

See also
 1927 Melbourne Carnival

Notes

References
 
 Hogan P: The Tigers Of Old, Richmond FC, (Melbourne), 1996. 
 World War One Service Record: John Joseph Sheehan, National Archives of Australia.

External links 
 
 
 Jack Sheehan's profile at Collingwood Forever
 Jack Sheehan on Demonwiki
 John Joseph Sheehan, at New South Wales Australian Football History Society.

1890 births
1933 deaths
Australian rules footballers from Victoria (Australia)
Australian Rules footballers: place kick exponents
Collingwood Football Club players
Richmond Football Club players